Grigorije Jezdimirović (Serbian:Григорије Јездимировић:Borovo Selo, near Vukovar, Srem, 1745 - Dalj, near Osijek, after 1822) was a Serbian painter.

From 1803 to 1804, painter Grigorije Jezdimirović worked on the iconostasis of the Serbian Orthodox Church of St. George in the Sveti Đurađ monastery, then part of the Austrian Empire, now Romania.

With master woodcarver Grigorije Dević, he also worked on the iconostasis of the church of Saint John the Baptist in Bačka Palanka in 1811.  In Osijek, Jezdimirović worked on iconostases with painters Jovan Isailović, Jovan Isailović, Jr., Jovan Stanisavljević and others of his generation.

References 

18th-century Serbian painters
18th-century male artists
19th-century Serbian painters
Serbian male painters
1745 births
Date of birth missing
Year of death unknown
19th-century Serbian male artists